The 2017 Conference USA football season was the 22nd season of Conference USA football and part of the 2017 NCAA Division I FBS football season. The season began on August 26 with Rice facing Stanford in Sydney, Australia. This season was the third season for C-USA under realignment that took place in 2014, which added the 14th member Charlotte from the Atlantic 10 Conference. C-USA is a "Group of Five" conference under the College Football Playoff format along with the American Athletic Conference, the Mid-American Conference, the Mountain West Conference, and the Sun Belt Conference.

C-USA consists of 14 members: Charlotte, FIU, Florida Atlantic, Louisiana Tech, Marshall, Middle Tennessee, North Texas, Old Dominion, Rice, Southern Miss, UAB, UTEP, UTSA, and Western Kentucky; and is divided into the East and West divisions. UAB will begin play for the first time since 2014, after the Blazer football program was dropped from competition.

Preseason

Media predictions
The 2017 preseason media football poll was released on July 18. Western Kentucky was picked to win its third straight East Division title, while Louisiana Tech was picked to repeat as West Division champion.
East Division
1. Western Kentucky (20 first-place votes)
2. Middle Tennessee (4) 
3. Old Dominion (3)
4. Marshall (1)
5. Florida Atlantic
6. FIU
7. CharlotteWest Division
1. Louisiana Tech (20) 
2. UTSA (7)
3. Southern Miss (1)
4. North Texas
5. Rice
6. UTEP
7. UAB

Preseason awards
The conference preseason awards were released on July 17. WKU senior QB Mike White was selected as the C-USA Offensive Player of the Year. Rice senior LB Emmanuel Ellerbee was selected the Defensive Player of the Year, and WKU senior KR Kylen Towner was selected Special Teams Player of the Year honors

Preseason Offensive Player of the Year: Mike White, Senior, QB, WKU
Preseason Defensive Player of the Year: Emmanuel Ellerbee, Senior, LB, Rice
Preseason Special Teams Player of the Year: Kylen Towner, Senior, KR, WKU

Head coaches
Three Conference USA teams hired new head coaches for the 2017 season. All three were in the East Division, and all three were replacing coaches who had spent at least three seasons at their respective schools.
 FIU hired Butch Davis to replace Ron Turner, who was fired after going 0–4 with the panthers. Ron Cooper was promoted as interim head coach after the fire until the hire of Davis. Davis is coming from a break from coaching football from 2011 to 2016. He was the head coach for many teams in college such as North Carolina and teams in NFL. Littrell was hired on November 14, 2016.
 Florida Atlantic hired Lane Kiffin to replace Charlie Partridge, who was fired after leading the Owls to a 9–27 record during his three-year tenure at Florida Atlantic. Kiffin spent three years prior to Florida Atlantic at Alabama as an offensive coordinator under the head coach, Nick Saban. Lane was hired on December 12, 2016.
 Western Kentucky hired Mike Sanford Jr. to replace Jeff Brohm, who resigned on December 5, 2016, to become the head coach at Purdue. Sanford was a quarterback coach and an offensive coordinator at Notre Dame for two seasons. Sanford was hired on December 14, 2016.

Note: All stats shown are before the beginning of the season.

Records against FBS conferences

Regular season

Post season

Postseason

Postseason awards
Most Valuable Player: Devin Singletary, RB, Florida Atlantic
Offensive Player of the Year: Mason Fine, QB, North Texas
Defensive Player of the Year: Marcus Davenport, DE, UTSA
Special Teams Player of the Year: Isaiah Harper, KR, Old Dominion
Coach of the Year: Bill Clark, UAB
Freshman of the Year: Spencer Brown, RB, UAB
Newcomer of the Year: Jalen Guyton, WR, sophomore, North Texas & Teddy Veal, WR, junior, Louisiana Tech

All-Conference Teams

Bowl games

(Rankings from final CFP Poll; All times Eastern)

Home game attendance

†Played at Legion Field in Birmingham, AL 

‡ Conference Championship Game

References